Christian Carlos Torres Hidalgo (born 5 September 1969) is a Chilean former professional footballer who played as a forward for clubs in Chile, Colombia, Mexico and Paraguay.

Club career
A product of the Deportes Puerto Montt youth system, he made appearances for the club in the Segunda División until 1991. Then, he moved to Universidad de Chile in 1991, where he played alongside Franz Arancibia. In his homeland, he also played for Deportes La Serena and O'Higgins. 

From 1993 to 1994 he played in Colombia for both Millonarios, where he scored one goal, and Cúcuta Deportivo in the top level.

From 1996 to 2000 he played in Mexico for León, América and C.F. Monterrey. In América, he coincided with players such as Leonardo Rodríguez, Rodrigo Valenzuela and Cuauhtémoc Blanco. As a member of Monterrey, he made appearances in the 1999 Copa Libertadores.

In 2001 he played for Paraguayan club Guaraní.

His last club was Deportes Puerto Montt in 2001, where he coincided with well-known players such as Esteban Valencia, José Luis Sánchez and Nelson Tapia.

Personal life
He is nicknamed Kitita since he was a child, as his grandmother called him.

His father was a musician and his mother died when he was 9 years old.

After his retirement, he emigrated to Mexico and has developed a career in sport management, working mainly with children.

References

External links
 
 
 Christian Torres at PlaymakerStats.com

1969 births
Living people
Chilean footballers
Chilean expatriate footballers
Puerto Montt footballers
Universidad de Chile footballers
Deportes La Serena footballers
Millonarios F.C. players
Cúcuta Deportivo footballers
O'Higgins F.C. footballers
Club León footballers
Club América footballers
C.F. Monterrey players
Club Guaraní players
Primera B de Chile players
Chilean Primera División players
Categoría Primera A players
Liga MX players
Paraguayan Primera División players
Chilean expatriate sportspeople in Colombia
Chilean expatriate sportspeople in Mexico
Chilean expatriate sportspeople in Paraguay
Expatriate footballers in Colombia
Expatriate footballers in Mexico
Expatriate footballers in Paraguay
Association football forwards
Naturalized citizens of Mexico